Bianchetta is part of the primary name or synonym of several Italian wine grape varieties including:

Bianchetta Trevigiana, grape most commonly known as Bianchetta
Bianchetta bianca, also known as Albarola
Bianchetta Casaco
Bianchetta Castelli Monfumo
Bianchetta di Bacedasco
Bianchetta di Diolo
Bianchetta Genovese, also known as Scimiscià
Arneis, also known as Bianchetta d'Alba
Maceratino, also known as Bianchetta Montecchiese